Adetus is a genus of beetles in the family Cerambycidae.

Species

 Adetus aberrans Galileo & Martins, 2003
 Adetus abruptus Belon, 1902
 Adetus alboapicalis Breuning, 1943
 Adetus albosignatus Breuning, 1943
 Adetus albovittatus Breuning, 1966
 Adetus analis (Haldeman, 1847)
 Adetus angustus Melzer, 1934
 Adetus antennatus (Thomson, 1868)
 Adetus atomarius Belon, 1902
 Adetus bacillarius Bates, 1885
 Adetus basalis Martins & Galileo, 2010
 Adetus binotatus (Thomson, 1868)
 Adetus brasiliensis (Melzer, 1923)
 Adetus brousi (Horn, 1880)
 Adetus cacapira Martins & Galileo, 2005
 Adetus catemaco Martins & Galileo, 2005
 Adetus cecamirim Martins & Galileo, 2005
 Adetus columbianus Breuning, 1948
 Adetus consors Bates, 1885
 Adetus costicollis Bates, 1872
 Adetus curtulus Bates, 1885
 Adetus curupira Galileo & Martins, 2006
 Adetus cylindricus (Bates, 1866)
 Adetus fasciatus Franz, 1959
 Adetus flavescens Melzer, 1934
 Adetus furculicauda (Bates, 1880)
 Adetus fuscoapicalis Breuning, 1942
 Adetus fuscopunctatus Aurivillius, 1900
 Adetus griseicauda (Bates, 1872)
 Adetus inaequalis (Thomson, 1868)
 Adetus inca Martins & Galileo, 2005
 Adetus insularis Breuning, 1940
 Adetus irregularis (Breuning, 1939)
 Adetus jacareacanga Galileo & Martins, 2004
 Adetus latericius Belon, 1902
 Adetus leucostigma Bates, 1880
 Adetus lewisi Linsley & Chemsak, 1984
 Adetus lherminieri Fleutiaux & Sallé, 1889
 Adetus lineatus Martins & Galileo, 2003
 Adetus linsleyi Martins & Galileo, 2003
 Adetus longicauda (Bates, 1880)
 Adetus marmoratus Breuning, 1942
 Adetus minimus Breuning, 1942
 Adetus modestus Melzer, 1934
 Adetus mucoreus Bates, 1885
 Adetus multifasciatus Martins & Galileo, 2003
 Adetus nanus (Fairmaire & Germain, 1859)
 Adetus nesiotes Linsley & Chemsak, 1966
 Adetus obliquatus Breuning, 1948
 Adetus obliquus (Bates, 1885)
 Adetus pacaruaia Martins & Galileo, 2003
 Adetus pictoides Breuning, 1973
 Adetus pictus Bates, 1880
 Adetus pinima Martins & Galileo, 2003
 Adetus pisciformis (Thomson, 1868)
 Adetus postilenatus Bates, 1885
 Adetus praeustus (Thomson, 1868)
 Adetus proximus Breuning, 1940
 Adetus pulchellus (Thomson, 1868)
 Adetus punctatus (Thomson, 1868)
 Adetus punctiger (Pascoe, 1866)
 Adetus pusillus (Fairmaire & Germain, 1859)
 Adetus salvadorensis Franz, 1954
 Adetus similis Bruch, 1939
 Adetus sordidus (Bates, 1866)
 Adetus spinipennis Breuning, 1971
 Adetus squamosus Chemsak & Noguera, 1993
 Adetus stellatus Martins & Galileo, 2008
 Adetus stramentosus Breuning, 1940
 Adetus striatopunctatus Breuning, 1940
 Adetus subcostatus Aurivillius, 1900
 Adetus subellipticus Bates, 1880
 Adetus tayronus Galileo & Martins, 2003
 Adetus tibialis Breuning, 1943
 Adetus trinidadensis Breuning, 1955
 Adetus truncatipennis Melzer, 1934
 Adetus tuberosus Galileo & Martins, 2003
 Adetus validus (Thomson, 1868)
 Adetus vanduzeei Linsley, 1934

References

 
Apomecynini
Cerambycidae genera